Apisai Toga (6 November 1945 – 30 January 1973) was a Fijian rugby union and professional rugby league player. After representing the Fijian national rugby union team in 1963, he switched to rugby league and played for the Rochdale Hornets and the St. George Dragons.

Playing career
Toga was from the Saunaka village near Nadi. Originally a rugby union player, he was part of the Fiji team that won the rugby tournament at the 1963 South Pacific Games, playing three matches and scoring three tries. His brother Sela later also represented and captained Fiji, making his debut the following year.

Rochdale Hornets
He switched to rugby league in 1964, signing for English club Rochdale Hornets. He made his debut for the club on 15 February in a home match against Workington Town. He played right- in the club's 5-16 defeat by Warrington in the 1965 Lancashire County Cup Final during the 1965–66 season at Knowsley Road, St. Helens.

St George Dragons
Not liking the weather in northern England, Toga signed for Australian club St George Dragons in 1968, becoming the first Fijian to play in the New South Wales Rugby League premiership. He was joined at the club by his brother Inisai Toga the following year. A crowd favorite at Kogarah Oval, he made an immediate impact at the Dragons, and played for five seasons at the club between 1968 and 1972, making 65 appearances and scoring nine tries. He played in several semi finals with St George, but never played in a grand final.

Death
Toga went home to Fiji during the 1972–73 off season, and cut his foot on coral and barbed wire which resulted in him dying of tetanus poisoning on 30 January 1973 after collapsing during a pre-season training run at Carss Park, New South Wales. He had only arrived back in Australia four days before his death. It was later reported that Toga was in convulsions for hours before later dying at St. George Hospital. The news of Toga's death greatly saddened the rugby league community, especially in Sydney. His body was returned to his homeland for burial on the following weekend, accompanied by Dragons captain Graeme Langlands.

References

1945 births
Sportspeople from Nadi
Fiji international rugby union players
Fijian rugby league players
Rochdale Hornets players
St. George Dragons players
Rugby league second-rows
Rugby league props
1973 deaths
Deaths from tetanus
Accidental deaths in New South Wales
Sport deaths in Australia